The women's 200 metre breaststroke event at the 2000 Summer Olympics took place on 20–21 September at the Sydney International Aquatic Centre in Sydney, Australia.

Charging back from third at the 150-metre turn, Hungary's Ágnes Kovács edged out U.S. swimmer Kristy Kowal on the final stretch to capture the gold in 2:24.35. Kowal, who seized off a powerful lead from the start, took home the silver in a new American record of 2:24.56. Her teammate Amanda Beard, silver medalist in Atlanta four years earlier, gave the Americans a further reason to celebrate as she enjoyed the race to move up from eighth after the semifinals for the bronze in 2:25.35, holding off a fast-pacing Qi Hui of China (2:25.36) by a hundredth of a second (0.01).

Qi was followed in fifth by Russia's Olga Bakaldina (2:25.47) and in sixth by South Africa's Sarah Poewe (2:25.72), fourth-place finalist in the 100 m breaststroke. Japan's Masami Tanaka (2:26.98) and Qi's teammate Luo Xuejuan (2:27.33) closed out the field.

World record holder Penny Heyns missed a chance to defend her Olympic title in the event, after helplessly winding up a twentieth-place effort in the prelims at 2:30.17. Shortly after the Games, she made a decision to officially announce her retirement from international swimming.

Earlier, Kovacs established a new Olympic standard of 2:24.92 on the morning prelims to clear a 2:25-barrier and cut off Heyns' record by almost half a second (0.50). Following by an evening session, she eventually lowered it to 2:24.03 in the semifinals.

Records
Prior to this competition, the existing world and Olympic records were:

The following new world and Olympic records were set during this competition.

Results

Heats

Semifinals

Semifinal 1

Semifinal 2

Final

References

External links
Official Olympic Report

B
2000 in women's swimming
Women's events at the 2000 Summer Olympics